Charles-Jean-François Chéron (1635–1698), often known as François Chéron, was a French goldsmith, medallist, and painter active in Rome and Paris; his cousin was the noted painter and poet Élisabeth Sophie Chéron. Chéron was born in Lunéville, where his father, Jean-Charles Chéron (fl. 1630s), was a jeweller and engraver to Charles IV, Duke of Lorraine. The younger Chéron moved to Rome in 1655 to help produce works for the Papal Mint. During his time in Rome, Chéron created medals of Pope Clement IX and Pope Clement X, Christina of Sweden, and Louis XIV of France (1672). In 1675 he was summoned to Paris by Louis XIV, and enrolled in the Académie royale de peinture et de sculpture in the subsequent year. His academy reception piece consisted of portrait medals of Charles Le Brun and others, with later work including a fine medal of Gian Lorenzo Bernini. Chéron was employed at the Medal Mint for 12 years, where he produced medals upon a wide variety of subjects and occasions. He died in Paris.

References 
 Oxford Index entry
 Victoria & Albert Museum entry
 Metropolitan Museum of Art entry
 Biographical Dictionary of Medallists: A–D, compiled by L. Forrer, Spink & Son, 1904, page 420.
 Medals and Plaquettes in the Ulrich Middeldorf Collection at the Indiana University Art Museum: 15th to 20th Centuries, Arne R. Flaten, Indiana University Press, 2012, page 134.
 Bernini: His Life and His Rome, Franco Mormando, University of Chicago Press, 2011, page 286.

French medallists